The men's decathlon event at the 2006 Commonwealth Games was held on March 20–21.

Medalists

Results

100 metres
Wind:Heat 1:  +0.2 m/s, Heat 2: –1.9 m/s

Long jump

Shot put

High jump

400 metres

110 metres hurdles
Wind: +0.1 m/s

Discus throw

Pole vault

Javelin throw

1500 metres

Final standings

References
Results

Decathlon
2006